Rafael Reyes (born 17 July 1951) is a Colombian former footballer who competed in the 1972 Summer Olympics.

References

1951 births
Living people
Association football defenders
Colombian footballers
Olympic footballers of Colombia
Footballers at the 1972 Summer Olympics
Deportes Tolima footballers